Matt Merrell (born April 19, 1985) is an American professional stock car racing driver. He has raced in the NASCAR Camping World Truck Series and the ARCA Racing Series, where he scored one win in 2011.

Motorsports career results

NASCAR
(key) (Bold – Pole position awarded by qualifying time. Italics – Pole position earned by points standings or practice time. * – Most laps led.)

Camping World Truck Series

ARCA Racing Series
(key) (Bold – Pole position awarded by qualifying time. Italics – Pole position earned by points standings or practice time. * – Most laps led.)

References

External links
 

1985 births
NASCAR drivers
ARCA Menards Series drivers
CARS Tour drivers
Living people
People from Portland, Texas
Racing drivers from Texas